Thema Yakaena Williams (born December 6, 1995) is a Trinidadian artistic gymnast. She finished 145th in the all-around at the 2011 World Artistic Gymnastics Championships and 59th in the all-around at the 2015 World Artistic Gymnastics Championships.

References 

1995 births
Living people
Trinidad and Tobago female artistic gymnasts